Achterhoek is a region in the east of Gelderland in the Netherlands.

Achterhoek may also refer to:
 Achterhoek (Nijkerk), a village in Gelderland, Netherlands
 Achterhoek (Overijssel), a village in Overijssel, Netherlands